Shabbir Ahmed is an Indian Bollywood lyricist and music composer . He was nominated for the Lyricist of the Year at the 4th Mirchi Music Awards for the song Teri Meri from the film Bodyguard.

Career 
He made his debut in 2004 with Salman Khan's Garv and has written songs for movies like ‘Wanted’, ‘Kya Love Story Hai’, ‘Partner’, ‘Apna Sapna Money Money’ and ‘Jodi Breakers’ amongst others. Ahmed credits his success in Bollywood to Salman Khan.

He has movies like God Tussi Great Ho, Kaal, Partner, Luck, Kismat Konnection, No Problem, Welcome, Wanted, Aag, Toh Baat Pakki!, Dil Kabaddi, Kya Love Story Hai, Rakht Charitra, Mission Istanbul, Hello Darling, Bombay to Bangkok, Bombay to Goa, Click, C Company, Jawani Deewani, Nehle Pe Dehla, Shaadi Karke Phas Gaya Yaar, Garva, Mittal v/s Mittal, Shade, Love Guru, Superstar and more in his credit.

Filmography as lyricist

Music Videos

Albums

Personal life 
Shabbir Ahmed was born in Jaunpur district of Uttar Pradesh and he got his basic education there. Later he moved to Mumbai for his livelihood. He married Shumaila Ahmed on 13 May 2014 and held a reception at Mumbai’s Lokhandwala Celebration Club on 14 May 2014.

Accolades

References

External links
 

Indian lyricists
Living people
21st-century Indian Muslims
Hindi-language writers
Hindi-language poets
Year of birth missing (living people)